Kealkill stone circle is a bronze age axial five-stone circle located just outside the village of Kealkill, County Cork in southwest Ireland. When it was excavated in 1938 it was thought the crucial axial stone indicated an alignment to the north, contrary to the general alignment of such stone circles to the southwest. However, later archaeologists have thought it is the comparatively insignificant stone to the southwest that is the axial stone. There are two associated standing stones nearby, one of which had fallen and was re-erected in 1938.

Type of stone circle
Kealkill is an example of the type of stone circle commonly found in counties Cork and Kerry. In 1909 they were first called recumbent stone circles because of their similarity to the recumbent stone circles of Aberdeenshire in Scotland which were also constructed to have a stone lying lengthways rather than upright. In 1975 the archaeologist Seán Ó Nualláin thought the differences from the Scottish rings were sufficiently great to call the Irish rings "Cork–Kerry stone circles" and the crucial stone became the "axial stone" rather than the recumbent stone – from the centre of the circle this stone marks the direction of an axis pointing southwest. Ó Nualláin identified two types of Cork–Kerry circle and Kealkill is in the five-stone category.

Location and design

This well-known stone circle is set on the slopes of Maughanclea Hill at  overlooking Bantry Bay on ground that would have been suitable for cultivation. Breeny More stone circle can be seen in the distance to the southwest.

However, by the time of excavation this stone had fallen, presumably blown down in a gale, leaving a  broken piece and a stump protruding  out of the ground. Two metres southeast of the standing stones is the cairn with four kerb stones.

Archaeology
In 1938 two shallow ditches were discovered in the acid peat crossing near the centre of the ring and it was supposed these once held wooden beams that in turn supported a vertical post. If this is correct it would be a unique feature for such a stone circle. Excavation of the cairn showed that there had originally been 18 radially-orientated kerb stones in a ring that was somewhat smaller than the  diameter of the cairn. Nothing was found helpful for dating purposes and there were no signs of burial within the circle or the cairn.

See also
 List of axial five-stone circles
 List of megalithic monuments in Cork

Notes

References

Citations

Works cited
 
 
 
 
 
 

Stone circles in Ireland
Archaeological sites in County Cork